Goilala District is a district of Central Province in Papua New Guinea. It is one of the four administrative districts that make up the province.

Local-level government areas

 Guari Rural
 Tapini Rural
 Woitape Rural

Towns and major villages

See also
 Districts and LLGs of Papua New Guinea

References

External links
 Official site 

Districts of Papua New Guinea